Segun Arinze (born Segun Padonou Aina in 1965) is a Nigerian actor and singer.

Early life and education
He is the eldest of seven children born to Lydia Padonu. He is descent of Badagry, Lagos State. He attended Victory College of Commerce in Ilorin, then proceeded to Taba Commercial College in Kaduna State to complete his secondary education. He studied Dramatic Arts at Obafemi Awolowo University. He is popularly known as Black Arrow which he gained from a role he played in the 1996 classic movie "Silent Night" a film by the late filmmaker Chico Ejiro.

He was married to fellow Nollywood actress Anne Njemanze, which later became a short-lived marriage. The couple has one daughter, Renny Morenike, who was born on 10 May.

Career
Segun Arinze started his career professionally as a singer and an actor. It was singing that first shot him into prominence, and that was after the release of his debut album, Dream, which was not particularly a commercial success. He started his acting career in Ilorin. Outside acting movies, Segun also is an acting coach and currently works with a prestigious African international film festival passing his knowledge on to the next generation of actors.

Selected filmography
Across the Niger
Silent Night 
Chronicles (with Onyeka Onwenu and Victor Osuagwu)
Family on Fire (2011)
A Place in the Stars (2014)
Invasion 1897 (2014)
Deepest Cut (2018) - with Majid Michel and Zach Orji 
The Island Movie (2018)
Gold Statue (2019)
Òlòtūré (2019)
She Is (2019)
Who's the Boss (2020)
Blood Sisters (2022)
Blogger's Wife (2017)

Awards and nominations

References

External links

 The African international film festival acting workshops

Nigerian male film actors
20th-century Nigerian male singers
Living people
20th-century Nigerian male actors
21st-century Nigerian male actors
Obafemi Awolowo University alumni
Yoruba male actors
Male actors in Yoruba cinema
Igbo male actors
1965 births
Nigerian male television actors
Nigerian singers